Malindi Sport Club is a Zanzibar football club based in Unguja. Established 1942 and most decorated club in Zanzibar.
For many years they dominated Tanzania, as champions of Zanzibar and Tanzania regional tournament. And from 1989 to 1992.
After achieving many national and regional titles, the team started playing for the Zanzibar Premier League in 2004 when the Zanzibar became an independent member of CAF, so they represent Zanzibar in the continental club championship.

Achievements

Zanzibar Premier League: 5
1959, 1964, 1989, 1990, 1992

Tanzanian Premier League: 2
1989, 1992

Tanzanian FA cup: 1
1993

Zanzibar FA Cup: 2
1994, 2019

Mapinduzi Cup: 1
2007

Performance in CAF competitions
African Cup of Champions Clubs: 2 appearances
1990: – Preliminary Round
1993: – First Round

African Cup Winners' Cup: 2 appearances
1994: Quarter-finals

References

Football clubs in Tanzania
Zanzibari football clubs